Twelve Oaks Mall is a shopping mall with over 180 stores which is located in Novi, Michigan, a suburb of Detroit. As of 2022, the mall features the traditional tenants Nordstrom, Macy's, and JCPenney. The mall currently features retailers Fabletics, Kate Spade, and Club Monaco.

The mall is located on the Northeast corner of Interstate 96 and Novi Road. Taubman Centers is the owner and manager of the mall. It is among the largest malls owned by Taubman, and one of the largest in Michigan in terms of gross leasable area and total stores. The mall completed a major remodel and expansion in 2007.

History

Planning and Opening 
Planning for the mall began in 1967 when the J.L. Hudson Corporation purchased land at the intersection of 12 Mile and Novi roads. Prior to its development as a mall, the site was proposed to be used as a landfill. Opposition by residents and the then-Village of Novi prevented the establishment of the landfill.

Another mall proposal in Farmington Township (now Farmington Hills) was proposed by The Taubman Company and Homart Development. Sears was signed on to anchor the proposed shopping center, and Hudson's was rumored to anchor the mall as well. The mall was to be located at Thirteen Mile Road, between Haggerty and Halsted, and set to open in 1974. Opposition to the proposed mall in Farmington Township pushed the developers west to the current location in Novi.

Twelve Oaks Mall was then developed as a joint venture between A. Alfred Taubman, Homart Development, and the Dayton-Hudson Corporation, Excavation of the site began in the spring of 1975, and construction began later that fall. The mall opened on August 2, 1977, anchored by Hudson's, with Sears opening on October 1, 1977, Lord & Taylor on March 6, 1978, and finally JCPenney on May 3, 1978.

The mall was designed by Gruen Associates, founded by the pioneer of the American shopping mall Victor Gruen, and Richard Prince. The head builder was Richard Marrone. The mall is one of three super-regional Taubman malls built in Metro Detroit during the late 1970s, the other two being Lakeside Mall in Sterling Heights and Fairlane Town Center in Dearborn.

21st Century 
In 2001, Hudson's converted to Marshall Field's. In 2002, The Taubman Corporation demolished the defunct United Artists Theatres and made way for a new "Lifestyle Cafe" food court, and allowed kiosks in the mall for the first time. This marked a change in Taubman policy, as it was originally believed that a food court would invite teenage loitering and that kiosks diminished the upscale atmosphere of the mall.

The expansion made Twelve Oaks Mall one of Taubman's largest mall properties. Construction began in February 2006, with Clark Construction Company taking on the project. Also in 2006, Marshall Field's converted to Macy's, and expanded to 300,000 sq ft.

In September 2007, the new Nordstrom opened with over 40 small specialty shops. The new anchor store was built on the southeast side of the mall, adjacent to the existing Lord & Taylor store.

In January 2013, The Cheesecake Factory announced that it would open at the mall later that year, and it opened on August 13, 2013.

In 2018, H&M moved to a two floor space in the Sears wing from its original location in the JCPenney wing. It is the first two-level H&M store in Michigan.

The late 2010s saw multiple classic chain anchors retreat from brick and morter after being challenged by digital retailers in recent years.

In March 2019, Sears was closed.

On August 2, 2020, it was announced that high end regional division Lord & Taylor would shutter.

In 2020, Crate & Barrel relocated their location at Somerset Collection in Troy to Twelve Oaks. A temporary location in the original H&M space opened on February 6 while the permanent location in the upper level Macy's wing is being constructed.

In February 2020, Simon Property Group planned to acquire Twelve Oaks Mall, along with Taubman's other malls, but the deal was terminated in June. Simon Property Group later reversed its decision and modified certain terms of the original merger agreement, including a modified purchase price of $43.00 per share in cash in November 2020. The merger closed in December 2020.

See also

Architecture of metropolitan Detroit
Metro Detroit
Tourism in metropolitan Detroit

References

External links 
 Official Twelve Oaks Site
 Twelve Oaks Mall on MallSeeker.com
 Oakland Press article about the newest expansion
 Demographic information for advertising inside the mall

Shopping malls in Oakland County, Michigan
Shopping malls established in 1977
Novi, Michigan
Taubman Centers
1977 establishments in Michigan
Victor Gruen buildings